"Rooftops (A Liberation Broadcast)" is a power ballad by Welsh rock band Lostprophets. "Rooftops (A Liberation Broadcast)" was released to American radio on 16 May 2006. The song was released on 19 June 2006 as the first single from their third studio album Liberation Transmission (2006).

The first live performance of the single in the UK was in the Muni Arts Centre in Pontypridd on 24 April 2006 prior to it even getting radioplay. The B-sides found on the single came from the same sessions – all of which are brand new tracks.

The single entered the UK Singles Chart at number eight, making it the highest performing Lostprophets single along with "Last Train Home". It was nominated for the Kerrang! Award for Best Single.

Music video
The music video for the song was filmed on location in Los Angeles, California and was directed by Ryan Smith. It shows the band performing on what appears to be a helicopter pad at the top of a tall building (possibly a hospital or a news station). At the beginning, the individual band members are shown while a flag showing the band's logo flutters behind them. As the band begins, three teenagers are shown: a girl sitting at dinner with her parents, who suddenly start arguing, a boy sitting in the back seat of a car as his father shouts at him while driving and another boy working in a restaurant kitchen as his boss starts berating at him. When the band reaches the "scream your heart out" refrain near the end of the song, the teenagers start to scream suddenly: the girl shatters every wine glass on the table as her mother covers her ears, the boy in the kitchen blows plates off the shelf in front of him, and the boy in the car shatters the car's windows. Another group of teenagers are then shown on the helicopter pad, in front of the same flag the band members were in front of at the beginning of the video, during the final chorus. The band then finishes the song, and the video fades out.

Track listing

(The B side of the vinyl release was an etched design rather than containing music)

Personnel

 Ian Watkins – lead vocals
 Lee Gaze – lead guitar
 Mike Lewis – rhythm guitar
 Stuart Richardson – bass guitar
 Jamie Oliver – piano, keyboard, samples, vocals
 Josh Freese – drums, percussion 
 Ilan Rubin – drums, percussion

Charts

Certifications

Other media
The song was included as a playable track in the video games Guitar Hero World Tour and Lego Rock Band.
WWE used the song as the background track for a promotional video highlighting the career of Jeff Hardy. However, on the WWE Network, the song has been replaced due to the sexual offences of Ian Watkins.

References

External links
ContactMusic review

Lostprophets songs
2006 singles
Rock ballads
2006 songs
Columbia Records singles
Song recordings produced by Bob Rock